Megalocoleus is a genus of plant bugs in the family Miridae. There are about 18 described species in Megalocoleus.

Species
These 18 species belong to the genus Megalocoleus:

 Megalocoleus aurantiacus (Fieber, 1858)
 Megalocoleus bolivari (Reuter, 1879)
 Megalocoleus chrysotrichus (Fieber, 1864)
 Megalocoleus delicatus (Perris, 1857)
 Megalocoleus dissimilis (Reuter, 1876)
 Megalocoleus eckerleini Wagner, 1969
 Megalocoleus exsanguis (Herrich-Schaeffer, 1835)
 Megalocoleus femoralis (Reuter, 1879)
 Megalocoleus krueperi (Reuter, 1879)
 Megalocoleus longirostris (Fieber, 1861)
 Megalocoleus lunula (Fieber, 1861)
 Megalocoleus matricariae Wagner, 1968
 Megalocoleus mellae (Reuter, 1876)
 Megalocoleus molliculus (Fallén, 1807)
 Megalocoleus naso (Reuter, 1879)
 Megalocoleus stysi Matocq, 2008
 Megalocoleus tanaceti (Fallén, 1807)
 Megalocoleus tarsalis (Reuter, 1894)

References

Further reading

External links

 

Phylini
Articles created by Qbugbot